Kyle Elton Russell (born 25 August 1993) is an American volleyball player who has played in Europe and South Korea.

He competed for 4 years on the University of California Irvine men's volleyball team. 

He currently plays for Arago de Sète in the French LNV Ligue A League.

In April of 2022, Russell pulled off eight aces in a row.

References

External links

  at TeamUSA

1993 births
Living people
American men's volleyball players
UC Irvine Anteaters men's volleyball players
Sportspeople from Sacramento, California
Opposite hitters
Expatriate volleyball players in Poland
Expatriate volleyball players in Germany
Expatriate volleyball players in France
Expatriate volleyball players in South Korea
American expatriate sportspeople in Poland
American expatriate sportspeople in Germany
American expatriate sportspeople in France
American expatriate sportspeople in South Korea
People from Loomis, California
University of California, Irvine alumni